ZygoteBody, formerly Google Body, is a web application by Zygote Media Group that renders manipulable 3D anatomical models of the human body. Several layers, from muscle tissues down to blood vessels, can be removed or made transparent to allow better study of individual body parts. Most of the body parts are labelled and are searchable.

Technology 
The human models are based on data from the Zygote Media Group. The website uses JavaScript and WebGL technology to display 3D images inside the web browser without requiring the installation of external browser plug-ins.

History 

ZygoteBody was launched as Google Body on December 15, 2010. On April Fools' Day 2011, users were greeted with the anatomy of a cow on the home page. The cow model is still available as part of the open-3d-viewer open source project.

As part of the wind down on Google Labs, it was announced that Google Body will be shut down but will continue to be maintained by Zygote as ZygoteBody. On October 13, 2011 the Google Body site was shut down. Then on January 9, 2012 ZygoteBody was launched and core code base (with the Google Cow model as a demo) was made available as an open source project called open-3d-viewer.

See also
 Visible Human Project
 Google Health
 Anatomography

References

External links 

  
 open-3d-viewer

2010 software
Anatomical simulation
Anatomy websites
Discontinued Google services
Google services
Web applications